Liverpool Record Office holds the archives for the city of Liverpool. The archives are held at the Central Library, William Brown Street, Liverpool and run by Liverpool City Council.

References

Liverpool
Archives in Merseyside
History of Liverpool